The 1947 Oklahoma City Chiefs football team represented Oklahoma City University as an independent during the 1947 college football season. Led by Bo Rowland in his second and final season as head coach, the team compiled a record of 7–3.

Schedule

References

Oklahoma City
Oklahoma City Chiefs football seasons
Oklahoma City Chiefs football